Of the 102 counties of the state of Illinois, 84 are organized into civil townships, usually referred to as simply "townships" in state law. All told, Illinois has 1,428 such townships, and they are the slight majority of the state's general units of local government.

The legal name of each township is the form "___ Township" or "Town of ".  State law specifies that no two townships in Illinois shall have the same name, and that, if the Illinois Secretary of State compares the township abstracts and finds a duplicate, the county that last adopted the name shall instead adopt a different name at the next county board meeting.  Nonetheless, many township names remain duplicates in Illinois.

History
Local government in the Illinois Territory, and the state of Illinois after 1818 statehood, was predominantly handled by the state's counties, although towns and villages also existed. Chicago was chartered as the state's first city in 1837.

The 1848 Constitution of Illinois granted the voters of counties the ability to divide their county into townships.

Other forms

Cook County is organized into townships except for the city of Chicago: in 1902, voters in Chicago chose to abolish the eight townships in the city.

There are 17 counties with no township government: Alexander, Calhoun, Edwards, Hardin, Johnson, Massac, Menard, Monroe, Morgan, Perry, Pope, Pulaski, Randolph, Scott, Union, Wabash, and Williamson.  Each of those counties is instead divided into precincts. Unlike townships, precincts have no functions in of themselves and all their administrative functions are performed by the county.

Organization and naming
Each county has the option to adopt or discontinue the township form of government.

Each township name is chosen by "in accordance with the express wish of the inhabitants"; but if "there is not a degree of unanimity as to the name", then the name may be chosen by the commissioners that are dividing the county into townships.  In addition, if the county board is petitioned by a majority of the township's voters, the board may change the township's name.

Each township is governed by an elected board, which consists of a "supervisor" plus four "trustees".  There are special provisions for automatic creation of a township in any city or village where township organization has been chosen for the county but some of the municipality's territory does not yet have an organized township; for consolidating the territory of a city across multiple townships into a single township for the city at the voters' request; and for creating an optional "coterminous" township that follow the borders of a city in most circumstances and allows the city council to act as the township board.

Powers
 enumerates general services that townships are allowed to spend money on:
 Public safety (including law enforcement, fire protection, and building code enforcement).
 Environmental protection (including sewage disposal, sanitation, and pollution abatement).
 Public transportation (including transit systems, paratransit systems, and streets and roads).
 Health.
 Recreation.
 Libraries.
 Social services for the poor and aged.
 Development and retention of business, industrial, manufacturing, and tourist facilities within the township.

Other parts of  authorize townships to provide cemeteries,  comfort stations, community buildings, hospitals, monuments, open spaces, parks, facilities for the developmentally disabled, and disposal of brush and leaves.  After approval by a referendum, a township may also provide water and sewer services and general waste collection.

Townships

Coterminous townships
Several townships in Illinois are coterminous, each having boundaries identical to an incorporated municipality.  Also called "townships within a city" or a "coterminous municipality," conterminous townships are governed by the state's Township Code, and granted additional privileges and powers.  Those privileges and powers include the ability to combine township offices and city offices except that of township supervisor whose role then becomes supervisor of general assistance, the ability for the city council to exercise all of the powers of the township board, and the ability to unilaterally annex small portion of adjacent township territory.  

Some townships are functionally coterminous, in which a city completely encompasses their boundaries, but also includes additional territory of adjacent townships.  Examples of functionally coterminous municipalities include Granite City Township, Madison County; City of Peoria Township, Peoria County; and Capital Township, Sangamon County.  These townships retain coterminous status as it relates to the function and structure of their local government - for instance, Capital Township's roads are maintained by the Springfield Department of Public Works as opposed to a township highway commission.  However, unlike physically conterminous municipalities, functional coterminous municipalities can not unilaterally annex small portions of adjacent township territory, and must follow the regular annexation process laid out in the Illinois Municipal Code.   

, coterminous townships included:
Alton Township, Madison County (Alton, Illinois)
Berwyn Township, Cook County (Berwyn, Illinois)
Champaign City Township, Champaign County (Champaign, Illinois)
Bloomington City Township, McLean County (Bloomington, Illinois)
Cicero Township, Cook County (Cicero, Illinois)
Cunningham Township, Champaign County (Urbana, Illinois)
East St. Louis Township, St. Clair County (East St. Louis, Illinois)
Freeport Township, Stephenson County (Freeport, Illinois)
Galesburg Township, Knox County (Galesburg, Illinois)
Godfrey City Township, Madison County (Godfrey, Illinois)
Macomb City Township, McDonough County (Macomb, Illinois)
Oak Park Township, Cook County (Oak Park, Illinois)
Quincy Township, Adams County (Quincy, Illinois)
River Forest Township, Cook County (River Forest, Illinois)
Warsaw Township, Hancock County (Warsaw, Illinois)
Zion Township, Lake County (Zion, Illinois)

Former townships
Belleville Township, St. Clair County — Dissolved at the end of May 2017, under a new , with the approval of ordinances by the township in January 2016 and its co-terminous municipality, the City of Belleville, in May 2016.
Evanston Township, Cook County — formed as Ridgeville Township in 1850; boundaries changed and renamed Evanston Township in 1857; dissolved in May 2017 and functions transferred to City of Evanston
Hyde Park Township, Cook County — created in 1861; annexed into Chicago in 1889
Jefferson Township, Cook County — created in 1850; annexed into Chicago in 1889
Lake Township, Cook County — created in 1850; annexed into Chicago in 1889
Lake View Township, Cook County — formed from part of Ridgeville Township in 1857;annexed into Chicago in 1889
Milam Township, Macon County — merged into neighboring Mount Zion Township, Macon County in 2009.
North Chicago, South Chicago, and West Chicago Townships, Cook County, formed in the 1840s within Chicago, abolished 1902
Ridgeville Township, Cook County — see Evanston Township in this list
Rocky Run Township, Hancock County
Salisbury Township, Sangamon County — In 1989, Salisbury Township was extinguished and its territory annexed to Fancy Creek and Gardner townships.
South Fillmore Township, Montgomery County
Wilcox Township, Hancock County

See also

 List of census-designated places in Illinois
 List of municipalities in Illinois
 List of counties in Illinois
 List of precincts in Illinois
 List of unincorporated communities in Illinois

References

External links
 Census 2000 Gazetteer
 National Association of Towns and Townships
 Township Officials of Illinois

Townships
Illinois